Hardcore Superstar is the fifth studio album released in November 2005 by Swedish hard rock band Hardcore Superstar on the record label Gain. It placed #12 on the Swedish album chart and, in 2011, Sweden Rock Magazine name Hardcore Superstar the 3rd best album of the 2000s. The album was re-released in October 2009 with Nuclear Blast and included "Kick On The Upper Class (Rehearsal Take)," "We Don't Celebrate Sundays (Rehearsal Take)," and "Wild Boys (demo)" as bonus tracks..

Track listing

Personnel

Principal band members
 Jocke Berg - vocals
 Thomas Silver - guitar
 Martin Sandvik - bass, backing vocals, production
 Magnus "Adde" Andreasson - drums, percussion, backing vocals, production

Additional musicians and production
 Anders Ehlin - Moog synthesizer, Roland System 100, mellotron
 Ralf Gyllenhammar (of B-Thong) - backing vocals
 Oscar Carlquist (of RAM) - backing vocals
 Tomas Brandt - backing vocals
 Johan Reivén  (of LOK) - backing vocals, percussion, mixing, production
 Risza - mixing, production
 Martin Westerstrand (of LOK) - backing vocals
 Daniel Cordero (of LOK} - backing vocals
 Olof Lindgren (of Distorted Wonderland) - backing vocals
 Axel Karlsson (of Distorted Wonderland) - backing vocals
 Markus Tagaris - A&R; backing vocals, bass on "Wild Boys," arranging
 Maria "Vampirella" Lyttkens (of Notre Dame)- backing vocals
 Magnus Lundbäck - manager, A&R, arranging
 Dragan Tanaskovic - mastering
 Jani Peteri - artwork
 Emma Svensson - photography
 Klaudio Eskudero - illustrations

References

2005 albums
Hardcore Superstar albums
Hard rock albums by Swedish artists